Richard John Samuel Stevens (27 March 1757 – 23 September 1837) was an English composer and organist.

Biography
Stevens was born in London, where, in 1801, he was appointed Gresham Professor of Music. In 1808 he received yet another appointment, as music master at Christ's Hospital. Besides being valuable in themselves, these appointments helped him to attract the wealthy pupils on whom his living substantially depended.

In 1810 Stevens married Anna Jeffery, after a long courtship; in 1811 they had a son, Richard George, who entered Gray's Inn in 1834. He embarked on the life of a gentleman of leisure, made possible by a substantial bequest from one of his father’s friends in 1817. He died in Peckham near London.

Stevens's chief claim to attention is as a composer of glees. He was not prolific, considering the length of his life; the bulk of his composing was done between 1780 and 1800. Stevens was more careful than many contemporaries in his choice of texts, and devoted special attention to Shakespeare. Of his 15 Shakespearean glees, composed between 1782 and 1807, five are among his best-known pieces: "Ye spotted snakes" (1782, rev. 1791), "Sigh no more, ladies" (1787), "Crabbed age and youth" (1790), "Blow, blow, thou winter wind" (1793) and "The cloud-cap't towers"(1795).

Among Stevens’s compositions that did not outlive him were some anthems, including several for Christ's Hospital; three keyboard sonatas; an opera entitled Emma; and a few songs and hymn tunes. Stevens was a professional member of the Anacreontic Society and it is through his journal accounts that we know that John Stafford Smith wrote  their club song "The Anacreontic Song", which, considerably altered and with new words, is now the national anthem of the USA, "The Star-Spangled Banner".

See also
Argent, Mark (ed.). Recollections of R.J.S. Stevens: an organist in Georgian London. London: Macmillan, 1992. 314 p.

Notes

External links

Recollections of R. J. S. Stevens: An Organist in Georgian London

English classical composers
English organists
British male organists
1757 births
1837 deaths
English opera composers
Male opera composers
Glee composers
English male classical composers